Abdulovo (Abdul) is a rural locality (a selo) in Yakshimbetovsky Selsoviet of Kuyurgazinsky District, Bashkortostan, Russia. The population was 408 as of 2010. There are 4 streets.

Geography 
Abdulovo is located 30 km southwest of Yermolayevo (the district's administrative centre) by road. Karayevo is the nearest rural locality.

References 

Rural localities in Kuyurgazinsky District